Robert Means Thompson (2 March 1849 – 5 September 1930) was a United States Navy officer, business magnate, philanthropist and a president of the American Olympic Association. He is the namesake of the destroyer USS Thompson (DD-627).

Biography
He was born in Corsica, Pennsylvania, to John Jamison Thompson and Agnes Kennedy. He was appointed to the United States Naval Academy on 30 July 1864.  Graduating tenth in the class of 1868, Thompson first went to sea in Contoocook in the West Indian Squadron. He later served in Franklin, Richmond, and Guard of the Mediterranean Squadron; as well as in USS Wachusett and at the Naval Torpedo Station, Newport, Rhode Island.  Commissioned ensign on 19 April 1869, and promoted to master on 12 July 1870, he resigned from the Navy on 18 November 1871, to study law in his brother's office. 

After he was admitted to the Pennsylvania Bar in 1872, he was still not satisfied with his legal training so he studied law at Harvard, graduating in 1874. Thompson subsequently practiced law in Boston and was a member of the Boston Common Council from 1876 to 1878. He later became interested in mining and smelting enterprises, by which he earned his fortune. He was president of Orford Copper, which later merged into the International Nickel Company of Canada, of which he served as chairman.

He was an organizer of the Navy Athletic Association and the donor of the Thompson Cup, which is awarded to the winner of the annual Army–Navy Game. His interest in sport then extended to the Olympic Games, and was twice president of the American Olympic Association, once for the 1912 Summer Olympics, and again for the 1924 games. In 1912, he was also elected president of the New York Athletic Club. He also helped to organize the New York Chapter of the United States Naval Academy Alumni Association and served as its first president and as a trustee of the Naval Academy Alumni Association at Annapolis, Maryland.

Thompson was president of the Society of Naval Architects and Marine Engineers and president of the Navy League. He also visited Japan at the invitation of the Japanese government and was awarded the Order of the Rising Sun, Second Class, by the Emperor. He also received the Order of Vasa by the government of Sweden, and the Cross of Commander, French Legion of Honor, by the French government.

Thompson became a companion of the Military Order of the Loyal Legion of the United States (MOLLUS) in 1874 through the Massachusetts commandery.  He was active in MOLLUS affairs and was elected commander in chief October 27, 1927, and served in that capacity until his death.

He was also a companion of the Naval Order of the United States.

He co-edited the Confidential Correspondence of Gustavus Vasa Fox, Assistant Secretary of the Navy for the Navy Historical Society.

Robert Means Thompson was married to Sarah Gibbs, daughter of Rhode Island governor, William C. Gibbs. They had one daughter, Sarah Gibbs Thompson. He died while visiting his daughter and her husband, Stephen Hyatt Pell, at Fort Ticonderoga, New York.

He memorial service was held at the chapel of the United States Naval Academy and he is buried with his wife in the churchyard of St. Mary's Episcopal Church in Portsmouth, Rhode Island.

References

External links

1849 births
1930 deaths
Harvard Law School alumni
United States Naval Academy alumni
United States Navy officers
Recipients of the Order of the Rising Sun, 2nd class
Recipients of the Order of Vasa
Commandeurs of the Légion d'honneur
Presidents of the United States Olympic Committee
Businesspeople from Pennsylvania
Presidents of the New York Athletic Club